From Zero to I Love You is an American romantic drama film, directed by Doug Spearman and released in 2019. The film stars Darryl Stephens as Pete Logsdon, a gay man whose fear of intimacy has led him to continually fall for married men, and Scott Bailey as Jack Dickinson, a closeted married gay man who becomes Pete's newest love interest and forces both men to confront what they really want in their romantic lives.

The cast also includes Leslie Zemeckis, Keili Lefkowitz, Richard Lawson, Jai Rodriguez, Jay Huguley and Al Sapienza.

The film premiered on March 26, 2019, at BFI Flare: London LGBT Film Festival. It has since screened at other LGBT-oriented film festivals, including the Inside Out Film and Video Festival in Toronto, QFlix in Philadelphia and the Tampa International Gay and Lesbian Film Festival in Tampa Bay.

Cast 
 Scott Bailey as Jack Dickinson
 Darryl Stephens as Pete Logsdon
 Adam Klesh as John Armitage
 Richard Lawson as Ron Logsdon
 Keili Lefkowitz as Karla Dickinson
 Ann Walker as Barbara
 Shane Johnson as Clay
 Matt Cipro as Rich
 Jai Rodriguez as Andrew
 Jay Huguley as Eric Dupont
 Stephen Bowman as David
 Al Sapienza as Tracey Thayer
 Gregory Zarian as Christopher Randolph

References

External links

2019 LGBT-related films
2019 films
American LGBT-related films
American romantic drama films
LGBT-related romantic drama films
Gay-related films
African-American LGBT-related films
Films about interracial romance
2010s English-language films
2010s American films